The Diccionario geográfico-estadístico-histórico de España y sus posesiones de Ultramar is a geographic handbook of Spain. Originally published in 16 volumes between 1845 and 1850, it was edited and directed by Pascual Madoz. A widely known work in Spain (often simply known as "el Madoz"), used as reference work, it stands out in terms of the sheer amount of information, its systematization as well as for covering the whole geography of Spain.

Index 
The 16 volumes (including the alphabetical range of entries they cover) are listed as follows:
 Volume I: Aba – Alicante
 Volume II: Alicanti – Arzuela
 Volume III: Arra – Barcelona
 Volume IV: Barcella – Buzoca
 Volume V: Caabeiro – Carrusco
 Volume VI: Ca Sebastiá – Córdoba
 Volume VII: Cordobelas – Ezterripa
 Volume VIII: Faba – Guadalajara
 Volume IX: Guadalaviar – Juzvado
 Volume X: La Alcoba – Madrid
 Volume XI: Madrid de Caderechas – Muztiliano
 Volume XII: Nabaja – Pezuela de las Torres
 Volume XIII: Phornacis – Sazuns
 Volume XIV: Scalae Anibalis – Toledo
 Volume XV: Toledo – Vettonia
 Volume XVI: Via – Zuzones

References

External links 
 Diccionario geográfico-estadístico-histórico de España y sus posesiones de Ultramar at the Biblioteca Virtual de Andalucía.
 Diccionario geográfico-estadístico-histórico de España y sus posesiones de Ultramar at the Biblioteca Digital de Castilla y León
 Diccionario geográfico-estadístico-histórico de España y sus posesiones de Ultramar at HathiTrust

Area studies encyclopedias
Geography of Spain
Spanish non-fiction books
1845 books